Wings of Youth is a 1925 American silent drama film directed by Emmett J. Flynn and written by Bernard McConville. The film stars Ethel Clayton, Madge Bellamy, Charles Farrell, Freeman Wood, Robert Cain, and Katherine Perry. The film was released on May 21, 1925, by Fox Film Corporation.

Plot
As described in a film magazine review, Mrs. Katherine Manners loves her three grown daughters who are in boarding school. When she plans a party for them at home, they phone from the school that they cannot come because they are too busy. But she hears the sounds of a party in the background, so she goes to the school where she finds her daughters with young men. She is told that two of the daughters plan to be married, while the third plans to marry Grantland Dobbs as soon as he gets a divorce, and the mother is frightened by this announcement. She goes abroad and returns with a man, gets an apartment at a wealthy center, and lives with him. Her daughters are shocked when the mother entertains guests at drinking parties. When Mrs. Manners proves to her daughters that their fiancées are not respectable, she reveals to them that she was acting a part just to prove to them that she was right about their chosen mates. She reveals that the man she was living with was her cousin.

Cast

References

External links

1925 films
1920s English-language films
Silent American drama films
1925 drama films
Fox Film films
Films directed by Emmett J. Flynn
American silent feature films
American black-and-white films
Films with screenplays by Bernard McConville
1920s American films